TrSS Munich was a passenger vessel built for the Great Eastern Railway in 1908.

History

The ship was built by John Brown of Clydebank for the Great Eastern Railway as one of a contract for three new steamers and launched on 25 August 1908. She was launched by Miss Lawson, daughter of Sir Arthur Tredgold Lawson, Baronet, director of the Great Easter Railway.
 
She was placed on the Harwich to Hook of Holland route.

She was requisitioned by the Admiralty in 1914 and converted as a hospital ship and renamed St Denis. At the end of the war she returned to railway control but retained her new name.

In 1923 she was acquired by the London and North Eastern Railway.

She was relegated to relief and secondary services in 1932. In 1940 she was scuttled when cornered in Amsterdam. Having been raised by the Germans, she had her name changed to Barbara and was found in Kiel in 1945 where she served as an accommodation ship for Kiel University.

In 1950 she was towed to Thomas Young and Sons in Sunderland and scrapped.

References

1908 ships
Steamships of the United Kingdom
Ships built on the River Clyde
Ships of the Great Eastern Railway
Ships of the London and North Eastern Railway